Bullockus guesti is a species of sea snail, a marine gastropod mollusk in the family Fasciolariidae, the spindle snails, the tulip snails and their allies.

Description

Distribution

References

Fasciolariidae
Gastropods described in 2008